The 1887 New York Metropolitans finished with a 44–89 record, seventh place in the American Association. The team folded operations at the conclusion of the season. What was left of the team was purchased by the Brooklyn Grays, who were interested in several of the Metropolitans' players. The Kansas City Cowboys inherited the Metropolitans' place in the American Association for the 1888 season.

Regular season

Season standings

Record vs. opponents

Roster

Player stats

Batting

Starters by position 
Note: Pos = Position; G = Games played; AB = At bats; H = Hits; Avg. = Batting average; HR = Home runs; RBI = Runs batted in

Other batters 
Note: G = Games played; AB = At bats; H = Hits; Avg. = Batting average; HR = Home runs; RBI = Runs batted in

Pitching

Starting pitchers 
Note: G = Games pitched; IP = Innings pitched; W = Wins; L = Losses; ERA = Earned run average; SO = Strikeouts

Other pitchers 
Note: G = Games pitched; IP = Innings pitched; W = Wins; L = Losses; ERA = Earned run average; SO = Strikeouts

Relief pitchers 
Note: G = Games pitched; W = Wins; L = Losses; SV = Saves; ERA = Earned run average; SO = Strikeouts

References 
 1887 New York Metropolitans team page at Baseball Reference

New York Metropolitans seasons
New York Metropolitans season
New York Metropolitans season
History of Staten Island
Sports in Staten Island
St. George, Staten Island